Bears & Eagles Riverfront Stadium, originally simply Riverfront Stadium, was a 6,200-seat baseball park in Newark, New Jersey built in 1999. It was the home field of the Newark Bears, who played in the Atlantic League of Professional Baseball, an independent minor baseball league. The Bears played in the stadium from 1999 until 2013 when they announced a move to the Canadian-American Association of Professional Baseball, but the team was folded shortly thereafter.

The stadium was also home to the baseball teams of two of Newark's universities: the Rutgers-Newark Scarlet Raiders, who play in the New Jersey Athletic Conference as part of NCAA Division III, and the NJIT Highlanders, who play in the America East Conference as part of NCAA Division I.

The stadium was named in honor of the original Bears, who were the top farm club of the New York Yankees from 1946 until 1949, and the Newark Eagles, who played in the Negro leagues.  Above the press boxes, the stadium featured a Hall of Fame bearing the names of famed players from the Bears and the Eagles and baseball players from Newark.

The stadium cost $34 million to build. It was sold to a developer in 2016 for $23 million, and the site was designated for a commercial-residential project named Riverfront Square. The stadium was demolished in 2019.

History
The Newark Bears had joined the Atlantic League at its founding in 1998 but played their 'home' games at The Ballpark at Harbor Yard in Bridgeport, Connecticut during that first season, sharing the park with the Bridgeport Bluefish. Since the construction of the stadium was still not finished in 1999, the Bears played their first 20 home games at Skylands Park in Augusta, New Jersey, sharing the facility with the New Jersey Cardinals. The stadium hosted its first baseball game on July 16, 1999, when the Bears took on the Lehigh Valley Black Diamonds. 

The Bears nicknamed the stadium "Brick City" or "The Den".

Originally, the stadium was to be built along the Passaic River, perhaps at or near Riverbank Park, but the eventual site was at Broad and Orange Streets. The block of Orange Street, between Broad Street and McCarter Highway, was vacated to allow for the ballpark to be built.

In 2001, the Bears added "Bears & Eagles" to the name of the park.  The new name reflected the heritage represented by both the International League's Bears, and the Negro National League Newark Eagles, both of whom had played at Ruppert Stadium (demolished in 1967) in the area now called the Ironbound.

In 2019, the stadium was demolished to make way for a new development called Riverfront Square.

Public transportation 
The stadium was across the street from New Jersey Transit's Broad Street Station. Opened July 17, 2006, the Riverfront Stadium station on the Newark Light Rail provides service from Newark Penn Station.

See also 
 List of NCAA Division I baseball venues
 History of sports in Newark, New Jersey

References

External links 
 NJIT baseball
 Rutgers-Newark baseball
 Ballpark Reviews - Bears & Eagles Riverfront Stadium
 Minor League Ballparks - Bears & Eagles Riverfront Stadium

Newark Bears
Minor league baseball venues
Sports venues in Newark, New Jersey
College baseball venues in the United States
NJIT Highlanders baseball
Rutgers–Newark Scarlet Raiders
Baseball venues in New Jersey
Sports venues completed in 1999
Sports venues in New Jersey
Defunct baseball venues in the United States
1999 establishments in New Jersey
2019 disestablishments in New Jersey
Sports venues demolished in 2019
Demolished sports venues in New Jersey